Montemassi is a village in Tuscany, central Italy, administratively part of the comune of Roccastrada, in the province of Grosseto.

The village originated as a fortified village of the Aldobrandeschi family. The Republic of Siena conquered it in the mid-13th century, but in the following century it was held by the Pannocchieschi and the Cappucciani of Sticciano families. In 1328 it was conquered by the condottiero Guidoriccio da Fogliano, fighting for Siena; the event is depicted in a famous fresco in the Palazzo Pubblico of Siena.

In the mid-16th century it became part of the Grand Duchy of Tuscany, following its history thenceforth.

It features a large polygonal rocca and a line of walls.

Bibliography

See also 
 Piloni
 Ribolla
 Roccatederighi
 Sassofortino
 Sticciano
 Torniella

Frazioni of Roccastrada